Bear Island River is a river of Minnesota.  The river flows through the southeast portion of Morse Township in northern Saint Louis County.

See also
List of rivers of Minnesota

References

Minnesota Watersheds
USGS Hydrologic Unit Map - State of Minnesota (1974)

Rivers of Minnesota
Rivers of St. Louis County, Minnesota